Squatter's Rights is a 1946 animated short film produced in Technicolor by Walt Disney Productions. The cartoon is about a confrontation between Pluto and Chip and Dale who have taken up residence in Mickey Mouse's hunting shack. It was the 119th short in the Mickey Mouse film series to be released, and the only one produced that year.

The film was directed by Jack Hannah and features the voices of Dessie Flynn as Chip and Dale, and Pinto Colvig as Pluto. Mickey Mouse was voiced by both Walt Disney and Jimmy MacDonald, the latter making his debut as Mickey; he would go on to provide Mickey's voice for over 30 years. It was also Mickey's first post-war appearance. Some scenes featured recycled Mickey Mouse animation from the 1939 short The Pointer, with new animation for Mickey almost entirely provided by Paul Murry, who is now largely known for his time as a Disney comic book artist.

Squatter's Rights was released to theaters on June 7, 1946 by RKO Radio Pictures. In 1947, it was nominated for an Academy Award for Best Animated Short Film at the 19th Academy Awards, but ultimately lost to The Cat Concerto, an MGM Tom and Jerry film, which shared one of 7 Oscars for the Tom and Jerry series.

Plot
The chipmunks Chip 'n' Dale wake up one winter morning inside the wood stove they have made their home. The stove is located in Mickey Mouse's hunting shack (called "Mickey's Hydout") which appears to have been unoccupied for a while. Soon after, Mickey and Pluto arrive for the hunting season.

Pluto soon discovers that the stove is occupied by the chipmunks and helps Mickey build a fire to smoke them out. Chip and Dale realize what is happening and manage to blow out Mickey's matches and roll of newspaper before they can ignite the wood. Finally, Pluto gives Mickey a can of kerosene to use, which the chipmunks wouldn't be able to blow out. From a hiding place underneath the stove, the chipmunks take a match and burns Mickey's foot with it. Mickey assumes that Pluto is to blame (when the chipmunks shove the used match into Pluto's mouth) and scolds him (Mickey remains unaware of the chipmunks throughout the short), but immediately forgives him.

After Mickey leaves to get more wood, Pluto chases Chip and Dale across the room, with Chip hiding in Pluto's milk bowl and Pluto sucking up the milk, blowing Chip's cover. They lead Pluto across a table and mantle above the fireplace. Pluto accidentally gets his nose stuck in the muzzle of Mickey's rifle which is hanging over the fireplace. As Pluto tries to pull his nose free, he finds one of the hooks on which the rifle is mounted, is directly in front of the trigger; the more Pluto pulls, the closer the rifle gets to going off in his face. Gradually the table which Pluto is standing on with his hind paws starts to slide back. Pluto falls and therefore causes the rifle to fire, which luckily misses him. He lands on the floor, with the rifle landing on his head and arm, momentarily knocking him unconscious. Chip and Dale then come and pour ketchup on him so that it would look like he is bleeding.

Suddenly, Mickey returns having heard the gunshot, and when he sees Pluto, he's given the shocking impression that the latter is dead. Pluto wakes up however and at first starts to comfort Mickey, but when he sees the ketchup, he starts to panic thinking it is his blood. Mickey hurriedly carries him off to find help, thus Chip and Dale regain working ownership over the property, rejoicing this fact.

Voice actors
Mickey Mouse: Walt Disney
Pluto: Pinto Colvig
Chip and Dale: unknown

Production
Production for Squatter's Rights began in the spring of 1944, and finished by January 1946 upon the completion of the short film's Technicolor photography.

Releases
1946 – theatrical release
1955 – Disneyland, episode #2.5: "Adventures of Mickey Mouse" (TV)
1975 – "Walt Disney's Cartoon Carousel" (TV)
c. 1992 – Mickey's Mouse Tracks, episode #72 (TV)
1997 – The Ink and Paint Club, episode #1.5: "Chip 'n' Dale" (TV)

Home media
The short was released on December 7, 2004 on Walt Disney Treasures: The Complete Pluto: 1930-1947.

Additional releases include:
1984 – "Cartoon Classics: More of Disney's Best 1932-1946" (VHS)
2010 – iTunes (digital download)

See also
Mickey Mouse (film series)

References

1946 films
1946 animated films
1940s Disney animated short films
Films directed by Jack Hannah
Films produced by Walt Disney
Films scored by Oliver Wallace
Mickey Mouse short films
Pluto (Disney) short films
RKO Pictures animated short films
Squatting in film
Chip 'n' Dale films